The 1986 Virginia Slims of Indianapolis was a women's tennis tournament played on outdoor hard courts at the Indianapolis Racquet Club in Indianapolis, Indiana in the United States and was part of the 1986 Virginia Slims World Championship Series. It was the seventh edition of the tournament and ran from October 27 through November 2, 1986. First-seeded Zina Garrison won the singles title.

Finals

Singles
 Zina Garrison defeated  Melissa Gurney 6–3, 6–3
 It was Garrison's 1st singles title of the year and the 4th of her career.

Doubles
 Zina Garrison /  Lori McNeil defeated  Candy Reynolds /  Anne Smith 4–5, ret.

References

External links
 ITF tournament edition details
 Tournament draws

Virginia Slims of Indianapolis
Virginia Slims of Indianapolis
Virginia Slims of Indianapolis
Virginia Slims of Indianapolis
Virginia Slims of Indianapolis
Virginia Slims of Indianapolis